Josh Caray is an American sportscaster who is currently the Director of Broadcasting and play-by-play broadcaster for the Rocket City Trash Pandas (AA-Angels) of Minor League Baseball. Caray also broadcasts for the University of Alabama and University of Alabama at Birmingham, calling women's basketball, baseball, softball, soccer, gymnastics and volleyball.

Early life
Josh Caray grew up in Atlanta, Georgia, a fan of the 1990s Braves teams, watching alongside his father in Atlanta's TV and radio booths. He was a two-way lineman on The Lovett School football team, then attended Guilford College, where he called their football games on the radio. He later transferred to Oglethorpe University where he was on the track and field team then graduated in 2004.

Career
Caray began his broadcast career in 2005, serving as a fill-in sports anchor at WGST-AM in Atlanta. He began his play-by-play career in 2007 when he became the voice of the Rome Braves for two seasons. One of his highlights was calling a Braves-Savannah Sand Gnats game with his father, as the elder Caray made a day trip to Rome to join his son on air in April 2007. A year later, he was on air in Hickory, North Carolina, for another Rome Braves game when he found out his dad had passed away. He called the final eight innings of that contest knowing his father had died. During this time he also called football games for the Rome High School Wolves.

He later became the television play-by-play announcer with the Atlanta Braves Class AAA affiliate, the Gwinnett Braves, where he was paired with Brian Jordan.

After a season in San Angelo, Texas, with an independent team, Caray called games for the Southern Maryland Blue Crabs of the Atlantic League in 2011. He also worked for IMG College during this time as a studio host, producer and board operator. He served in this role for two years, first for UNLV basketball in 2010-11, then football and basketball for Tulane in 2011-12.

During this time, Caray transitioned into news where he worked as an anchor, reporter, and assignment editor for All News 106.7 WYAY in Atlanta. He also oversaw the television partnership between All News and Fox 5 (WAGA-TV). Despite being on the All News roster, Caray worked out of the Fox 5 newsroom where he assisted in script-writing, assistant produced, and fronted stories on dozens of newscasts in his 2.5 years there. Caray credits this as a turning point in his career as being on air daily allowed him to hone his skills and become more confident in his abilities.

After taking a TV news anchor position in Victoria, Texas, Caray was given the opportunity to get back into sports when Long Island's Stony Brook University tabbed him as their football and men's basketball radio voice. In his four years at Stony Brook, Josh called two FCS playoff football teams and became the first member of his family to broadcast a men's NCAA Tournament game when the Seawolves faced Kentucky in March 2016.

At this time, Caray returned to baseball, calling the action for the Hudson Valley Renegades (Short-Season A-Rays) from 2016-19 while also serving as the team's Media Relations Director.  He also freelanced for Holy Cross in Worcester, Massachusetts, and Yale University calling baseball and softball games.

In 2019, Caray returned South when the Rocket City Trash Pandas named him their Director of Broadcasting and play-by-play broadcaster. Caray also works as a freelancer for the University of Alabama on their SEC TV+ platform calling Crimson Tide baseball, soccer, volleyball and gymnastics. He also freelances for University of Alabama at Birmingham (UAB), calling women's basketball, softball and baseball for the Blazers.

Family
Caray is the grandson of Hall of Fame baseball broadcaster Harry Caray, son of Atlanta Braves Hall of Famer broadcaster Skip Caray, and the half-brother of current Cardinals TV voice Chip Caray.

He also has two nephews, Chris and Stefen, who are calling games for the Amarillo Sod Poodles (AA-Diamondbacks) in Texas.

Sources
 The Caray family gets a fourth generation of pro baseball broadcasters

 Renegades radio man Josh Caray is of baseball broadcast royalty

 The Tragic Death of Skip Caray Shocked the Atlanta Braves Community
 Better Know A Broadcaster: Josh Caray
 One-on-One with Josh Caray
 Paula Caray, wife of longtime Braves broadcaster Skip Caray, dies
 Josh Caray remembers father Skip Caray, play-by-play announcer for the Atlanta Braves

 Caray twins put fourth generation of family in baseball broadcast booth
 Behind the Scenes with Trash Pandas Broadcaster Josh Caray

References

College football announcers
College basketball announcers in the United States
Year of birth missing (living people)
Living people
Guilford College alumni
Oglethorpe University alumni
American television sports announcers
Baseball announcers